Bolesław Euzebiusz Mościcki (14 December 1877 – 18 February 1918) was a Colonel of both the Imperial Russian Army and Polish Army. Born in Wysokie Mazowieckie, in the Łomża Governorate of Congress Poland, Moscicki served during World War I in the 1st Uhlan Regiment of the Pulawy Legion. He died on February 18, 1918, near Luninets.

In 1902, after graduation from Officer School of the Russian Army, Moscicki was sent to Manchuria, to serve in the Amur Cavalry. He fought in the Russo-Japanese War, and, while still a soldier of the Amur Cavalry, fought in World War I. In 1917 Moscicki was promoted to polkovnik, and on 19 July that year, at the village of Porohy near Nadworna, he was named commandant of 1st Uhlan Regiment, part of the so-called Pulawy Legion. Five days later, Moscicki fought in the Battle of Krechowce, in which his unit defeated Bavarians of the Imperial German Army. To commemorate this victory, 1st Uhlan Regiment came to be known as 1st Krechowce Uhlan Regiment.

In February 1918 Moscicki, dressed in mufti, tried to cross Russian - German frontline in the region of Polesie. He wanted to get in touch with the Regency Council, but the mission failed when he was captured and killed by Bolsheviks and armed peasantry near Luninets. Moscicki was buried in Minsk, and in 1921 his body was transported to Warsaw, where a second funeral took place at Holy Cross Church. He was posthumously awarded the Virtuti Militari by Naczelnik Jozef Pilsudski.

References 
 Andrzej Suchcitz Dzieje 1 Pułku Ułanów Krechowieckich 1941-1947 wyd. Veritas Foundation Publication Centra. Londyn 2002 .
 Aleksander Wojciechowski, Zarys historii wojennej 1-go Pułku Ułanów Krechowieckich, Warszawa 1929
 Cezary Leżeński i Lesław Kukawski, O kawalerii polskiej XX wieku, Zakład Naukowy im. Ossolińskich – Wydawnictwo, Wrocław 1991, 

1877 births
1918 deaths
People from Wysokie Mazowieckie
People from Łomża Governorate
Russian military leaders
Polish Army officers
Imperial Russian Army personnel
Polish generals in the Imperial Russian Army
Russian military personnel of the Russo-Japanese War
Russian military personnel killed in World War I
Recipients of the Order of St. George
Recipients of the Virtuti Militari
Recipients of the Order of the Star of Romania
Recipients of the Croix de Guerre (France)